Tryblis is a genus of fungi in the family Odontotremataceae. It has two species. The genus was circumscribed in 1931 by Frederic Clements, with T. arnoldii assigned as the type species; this was originally described as Blitridium arnoldii by Heinrich Rehm in 1872. Tryblis signata was added to the genus in 1997 by Martin Magnes.

References

Ostropales
Ostropales genera
Taxa described in 1931